Conus aito, common name Paladin cone snail, is a species of sea snail, a marine gastropod mollusc in the family Conidae, the cone snails, cone shells or cones.

This snail is predatory and venomous and is capable of "stinging" humans.

Description
The length of the shell attains 57.5 mm.

Distribution
This marine species of cone snail occurs off French Polynesia.

References

 Rabiller M. & Richard G. (2014). Conus (Gastropoda, Conidae) from offshore French Polynesia: Description of dredging from TARASOC expedition, with new records and new species. Xenophora Taxonomy. 5: 25-49. page(s): 37, pl. 5, figs 1-4, 7-12

External links
 To World Register of Marine Species

aito
Gastropods described in 2014